"Lanterns" is the second single from Australian alternative rock band Birds of Tokyo's fourth album, March Fires. Band member Ian Berney said "It was always about our own sense of community and reaching far and wide in the most positive way we could, with the most positive message we had at the time, and it really connected with people."

Music video
The music video for "Lanterns" was directed by Josh Logue and was shot in Sydney, Australia. It was nominated for Best Video at the ARIA Music Awards of 2013.

Chart performance
"Lanterns" debuted at number five on the ARIA Singles Chart on the issue dated 28 January 2013 It was the band's first ever single to hit the top 10 in Australia. "Lanterns" reached its peak of number three two weeks later. It also topped the ARIA Australian Singles Chart for a total of nine weeks.

Charts

Weekly charts

Year-end charts

Certifications

Accolades

Release history

References

External links
 Official music video on YouTube

Birds of Tokyo songs
2013 songs
2013 singles
APRA Award winners
EMI Records singles